Artyom Aleksandrovich Kuznetsov is a Russian speed skater. He competed at the 2014 Winter Olympics in Sochi, in the 500 meters finishing 19th overall with a best time of 35.14 seconds. He received a gold medal in race 1 for his 34.85 seconds time on November 30, 2013, and a bronze medal in race 2 for his 34.92 seconds time on December 1, 2013, at the ISU 2013-14 Speed Skating World Cup 3 in Nur-Sultan, Kazakhstan. He competes with Cherepovets Dynamo in Vologda Oblast.

In December 2017, he was one of eleven Russian athletes who were banned for life from the Olympics by the International Olympic Committee, after doping offences at the 2014 Winter Olympics.

References

1987 births
Living people
People from Yartsevo
People from Cherepovets
Speed skaters at the 2014 Winter Olympics
Russian male speed skaters
Olympic speed skaters of Russia
Doping cases in speed skating
Russian sportspeople in doping cases
Sportspeople from Smolensk Oblast